William F. Hamilton (born 1941) is the Ralph Landau Professorship of Management and Technology at the University of Pennsylvania and a management consultant. Hamilton is a pioneer and advocate of joint-degree programs of business and engineering. He started the Management and Technology Program in 1977 and founded the Jerome Fisher Program in Management and Technology in 1978. Hamilton served as Director of the Jerome Fisher Program in Management and Technology in the Wharton School and the School of Engineering and Applied Science at the University of Pennsylvania until his retirement in 2015. He co-founded the Department of Operations and Information Management at Wharton. He participated in the creation of Penn's Weiss Technology House, Wharton's Program in Emerging Technologies, and the Executive Masters Program in Technology Management in the Engineering School.

References

Alumni of the London School of Economics
Wharton School of the University of Pennsylvania alumni
Living people
1941 births
University of Pennsylvania School of Engineering and Applied Science alumni
University of Pennsylvania faculty